Erol Bilgin (born 20 February 1987 in Kütahya, Turkey) is a Turkish European champion in weightlifting competing in the 62 kg division. He was disqualified from the Olympics for an anti-doping violation.

Career
He was born in the western Anatolian city of Kütahya. Bilgin started weightlifting in 1998 at the Kütahya Gençlik Merkezi S.K. Two years later, he transferred to Tarım Kredi S.K. He is coached by Hilmi Pekünlü.

He ranked 8th in the 62kg category at the 2012 Olympics, but was subsequently disqualified for an anti-doping violation; re-analysis of Bilgin's samples from London 2012 resulted in a positive test for the prohibited substances Dehydrochlormethyltestosterone (Oral Turinabol) and Stanozolol.

Achievements
 World Championships  
	
 European Championships  	

 University World Championships  	
World Junior Championships  	

 European Junior Championships  	

 European Youth 17 Championships  	

 European Under 16 Championships  	

ER: European Record

World rank
Bilgin ranked 12th in the world list as of 2008, sharing the place with Antoniu Buci from Romania, with his result of 295 kg in total achieved at the 2008 European Weightlifting Championships held in Lignano Sabbiadoro, Italy.

References

External links
 
 
 
 

1987 births
Living people
People from Kütahya
Turkish male weightlifters
Olympic weightlifters of Turkey
Weightlifters at the 2012 Summer Olympics
European champions in weightlifting
European champions for Turkey
World Weightlifting Championships medalists
Competitors at the 2018 Mediterranean Games
Mediterranean Games silver medalists for Turkey
Mediterranean Games medalists in weightlifting
European Weightlifting Championships medalists
Doping cases in weightlifting
Turkish sportspeople in doping cases
21st-century Turkish people